Tea Pet or Tea Lover's Pet, also known as Chachong, is a small pottery figure which is kept by some tea drinkers for good luck. They are usually made of "zisha" or Yixing clay, from the region near Yixing in Jiangsu province, China. Similar to Yixing teapots made from the same clay, tea pets are unglazed, and are mostly monochromatic with a rough surface.

A tea pet is typically placed on a tea tray and has tea poured over it during tea time. Due to the tea pet not being glazed, the figurine absorbs some of the tea, resulting in the tea pet changing color over time, as well as building up a tea scent.

One of the most popular models for the tea pet is the "pee-pee boy", which, when first soaked in cold water and then showered with hot water, will squirt out the water it previously absorbed.

History 

The birthplace of tea pets, Yixing, was first famous as the birthplace of Yixing clay in Song dynasty (960–1279 CE). With the popularity of the Yixing clay teapot, Yixing became a major production center for tea pots, mugs, and other things used for making tea. Teapot artisans then began molding Yixing clay into various mythical creatures or animals as mascots for tea enthusiasts, with production still concentrated in Yixing region in the modern day.

Despite the longevity of Yixing as a production centre for tea products and accessories, little was written on the development of tea pets in Chinese history, with few literary sources detailing their use and production.

Types
Tea pets are typically handmade using unglazed Yixing clay, resulting in the tea pet retaining the clay's natural color. There are three kinds of Yixing clay: purple, red, and green. A tea pet can be made from either of one of these clays, or a mixture of two to produce different colors.

 Purple clay is the principal clay, which turns red-brown or dark-brown after firing. The artisan often adds iron clay to achieve a better color effect.
 Red clay, also known as "stock yellow", has a much higher contraction percentage than purple clay, and shows a vermillion color after firing. Because of its high contraction percentage, red clay is more suitable for making small-sized objects like tea pets and teapots.
 Green clay has a color similar to duck egg shell, and appears off-white after firing. It is rarer than purple clay, and more expensive.

Maintenance
The maintenance of a tea pet is similar to that of a Yixing clay teapot. Leftover tea or leaf-rinsing water is typically poured over a tea pet, and a tea brush is used to wipe the surface of the tea pet to help it absorb the tea evenly. Tea pets should be only rinsed with water, without using soap or any dish-washing liquid, to ensure a progressive increase in the color of the tea. After prolonged maintenance, over months or years, the tea pet will absorb the tea, and its appearance will become glossier.

"Pee-pee Boy" Tea Pet
The "pee-pee boy" is the most representative and popular figure of a tea pet.

The main feature of the "pee-pee boy" is the ability to squirt water when hot water is poured onto it. To do this, the tea pet, which is hollow, is immersed in cold water until it is filled up, and is shaken to ensure it is halfway filled with water; after this, hot water poured over the "pee-pee boy" will make it "pee" if the water is hot enough. The hotter the water, the farther it "pees".

The principle behind the "pee-pee boy" is thermal expansion of air. It is designed to be hollow with only one tiny opening, so that water can flow into the "pee-pee boy" at a slow pace, and will not drip out until sufficiently hot water is poured on its head. When hot water is poured over its head, the air in the "pee-pee boy" expands, resulting in the water being squeezed out through the tiny opening. Experimental and simulation results based on thermodynamics and fluid mechanics principles have verified the capability of such device to measure temperature.

In recent times, the feature of thermal expansion resulting in the propulsion of water has been utilized in other forms of tea pet, such as to create water-breathing dragons or water-spraying tortoises.

In Popular Culture
Tea Pets is a 2017 Chinese 3D computer animated film about the adventures of a group of tea pet figurines. It was made by the Light Chaser Animation Studios.

See Also
Chinese tea
Chinese tea culture
List of Chinese teas

References

External links
"Tea Pet: Tea lover's pet" . Sina.com. Retrieved 2014-02-03
"Do you know Tea Pet?" . YNET.com. Retrieved 2014-02-03

Chinese pottery
Tea culture
Teaware